Agis-Léon Ledru (1816-1885) was a French architect and politician.

Early life
Agis-Léon Ledru was born in 1816. His father, Louis-Charles-François Ledru, was an architect.

Ledru graduated from the École des Beaux-Arts in Paris in 1837, where Louis-Hippolyte Lebas and Jean-Nicolas Huyot were his professors.

Career
Ledru was an architect in the Puy-de-Dôme. Some of the buildings he designed, like the Église Saint-Ferréol in Murol, are listed as official historic monuments. He also designed the spas in La Bourboule, Chamalières and Royat. Additionally, he designed a convent, a school and a fountain in Riom.

Meanwhile, Ledru served as the mayor of Clermont-Ferrand from 1871 to 1873 or 1874.

Death
Ledru died in 1885.

References

1816 births
1885 deaths
Architects from Clermont-Ferrand
Mayors of Clermont-Ferrand
École des Beaux-Arts alumni
19th-century French architects
Prix de Rome for architecture